Eastcombe  may refer to:
Eastcombe, Gloucestershire, England
Eastcombe, Mendip, Somerset, England
Eastcombe, Taunton Deane, Somerset, England